Dodunekov Bluff is the ice-covered bluff rising to 1382 m in the west foothills of Bruce Plateau on Graham Coast in Graham Land, Antarctica.  It has steep and partly ice-free southwest slopes, and surmounts Caulfield Glacier to the north and Rickmers Glacier to the south.

The peak is named after Stefan Dodunekov (1945-2012), for his support for the Bulgarian Antarctic topographic surveys and mapping.

Location
British mapping in 1976.

Maps
 Antarctic Digital Database (ADD). Scale 1:250000 topographic map of Antarctica. Scientific Committee on Antarctic Research (SCAR). Since 1993, regularly upgraded and updated.
British Antarctic Territory. Scale 1:200000 topographic map. DOS 610 Series, Sheet W 66 64. Directorate of Overseas Surveys, Tolworth, UK, 1976.

Notes

References
 Bulgarian Antarctic Gazetteer. Antarctic Place-names Commission. (details in Bulgarian, basic data in English)
 Dodunekov Peak. SCAR Composite Antarctic Gazetteer.

External links
 Dodunekov Bluff. Copernix satellite image

Mountains of Graham Land
Bulgaria and the Antarctic
Graham Coast